VFP-206 was a Light Photographic Squadron of the United States Navy Reserve established on 1 June 1970. The squadron was disestablished on 29 March 1987.

Operational history

1970's to Disestablishment
VFP-206 would be the last US Navy unit to operate the F-8 Crusader and was the last specialized photographic reconnaissance aircraft in Navy service. The last operational RF-8G #146860, was donated to the Smithsonian Institution on 30 March 1987, the day after VFP-206 was disestablished, it is now on display at the Steven F. Udvar-Hazy Center.

Home port assignments
NAF Washington

Aircraft assignment
RF-8G Crusader

See also
 Reconnaissance aircraft
 List of inactive United States Navy aircraft squadrons
 History of the United States Navy

References

External links

Fleet air reconnaissance squadrons of the United States Navy